Luther Owen Barnes (born April 28, 1947, in Forest City, Iowa) is a former professional baseball second baseman and shortstop who played Major League Baseball for the New York Mets from -. Barnes attended  North Salem High School then college at Oregon State University. He was drafted by the Mets in the 21st round (482nd overall) of the 1969 amateur draft.

He is the great uncle of Hollywood actor and filmmaker, Cal Barnes.

References

External links

Baseball Almanac 
Baseball Gauge
Venezuelan Professional Baseball League

1947 births
Living people
Baseball players from Oregon
Florida Instructional League Mets players
Indianapolis Indians players
Leones del Caracas players
American expatriate baseball players in Venezuela
Major League Baseball second basemen
Major League Baseball shortstops
Marion Mets players
Memphis Blues players
New York Mets players
Oregon State Beavers baseball players
Oregon State University alumni
People from Forest City, Iowa
Pompano Beach Mets players
Tidewater Tides players